The Battle of Momotsugi was fought on October 9, 1539 when an army of the Iriki-in clan (loyal to Shimazu Takahisa) stormed the castle of Iwaya, aligned with the rival Shimazu Sanehisa.

Sanehisa had been the lord of Izumi castle in Satsuma province. He was a member of a branch family of the Shimazu. In 1526 he rebelled against Shimazu Katsuhisa and managed to expel him from Satsuma Province. Sanehisa attempted to establish himself as an independent power. With the clan's allegiance divided, Iriki-in Shigetomo remained loyal to Katsuhisa and his successor Takahisa.

Momotsugi Castle had been granted to the Iriki-in in 1536, motivating Shigetomo to capture it first since it was held by Sanehisa's forces. Shigetomo took the castle on a single night raid. The action earned Shigetomo's praise from his Lord Shimazu Takahisa.

References 

Momotsugi
1539 in Japan
Shimazu clan
Conflicts in 1539